In October 1938, about 17,000 Polish Jews living in Nazi Germany were arrested and expelled. These deportations, termed by the Nazis Polenaktion ("Polish Action"), were  ordered by SS officer and head of the Gestapo Reinhard Heydrich.  The deported Jews were rejected by Poland and therefore had to live in makeshift encampments along the Germany–Poland border.

Origins 
From 1935 to 1938, Jews living within Germany had been stripped of most of their rights by the Nuremberg Laws, and faced intense persecution from the state. As a result, many Jewish refugees sought rapidly to emigrate out of the Reich. However, most countries, still feeling the effects of a global depression, enacted strict immigration laws and simply would not address the refugee problem. According to a census conducted in 1933, over 57 percent of the foreign Jews living in Germany were Polish. The Polish Government, fearing an influx of Jews from the Reich, took drastic steps to isolate its Jewish citizens abroad.

On October 6, 1938, the Polish Ministry of Internal Affairs announced an ordinance requiring that Polish citizens living outside Poland obtain an endorsement stamp on their passports before October 30. Any passport without the stamp would become void and the owner of the passport would have his citizenship rights revoked. When thousands of Polish Jews in Germany presented their passports at Polish consular offices, they were denied the necessary stamp for various reasons. By enacting this decree and denying the stamp to Jews, the Polish Government made it clear that they had no interest in taking in Jews from the Reich, even those who were Polish citizens.

The Polish decree did not please the German Government. In 1938, Nazi policy regarding the Jews was heavily centered on emigration from the Reich rather than the mass extermination that would arise in 1942 during World War II. Thus, Nazi officials saw the Polish decree as a hindrance to their attempts at forcing Jewish emigration. In a letter to Hans Lammers, Chief of the Reich Chancellery, SS Obergruppenfuhrer Werner Best wrote:

Fearing the prospect of thousands of Polish Jews unable to legally emigrate from the Reich, the German Government felt that it had to act. As head of the Gestapo, Heydrich ordered that Polish Jews be expelled from the Reich.

Deportations 
From October 27 until October 29, the day before the Polish decree regarding the eligibility of passports was set to take effect, state authorities in Germany arrested approximately 17,000 Polish Jews and cancelled their German permits of residence. The Gestapo was easily able to locate those arrested through registration data and census files.

After being arrested, thousands of Polish Jews were stripped of any personal property or money and put on trains. These trains brought the deportees to the Germany–Poland border. The Polish border authorities were overwhelmed at first by the unexpected influx of people and during the first day of expulsions they allowed thousands of Polish Jews entry into Poland. However, the Polish Government quickly responded by closing the border down and denying any further access. In the city of Leipzig, 1,300 Polish Jews were able to find refuge in the Polish consulate, assisted there by the Consul General Feliks Chiczewski.

By October 30, thousands of homeless Jews resided in no-man's land along the border. Historians estimate that 4,000 to 6,000 Jews were deported between the southern towns Bytom (then Beuthen) and Katowice, 1,500 were placed near the northern town of Chojnice, and 8,000 were sent to the town of Zbąszyń (source 2 pp. 123). In Zbąszyń a large refugee camp was established as an attempt to give shelter to those deported. For months, refugees in Zbąszyń slept in poorly constructed barracks with very few provisions. The severity of the conditions within the camp was witnessed by Polish historian Emanuel Ringelblum who described the hopelessness of the refugees in a letter to a colleague.

As a result of the Polenaktion of October 1938, most of the 17,000 expelled Jews would remain in refugee camps on the border for almost a year. It was not until just prior to the German Invasion of Poland in 1939 that the refugees of the Polenaktion gained access to Poland's interior.

Response of Herschel Grynszpan 

Among those deported on October 27 in Hanover, Germany was the family of Sendel Grynszpan. Grynszpan described police coming to their home on Thursday October 27, demanding that they go to the nearest precinct with their Polish passports. When they arrived, hundreds of people were waiting for further instructions. The police notified the crowd that they were to sign papers and present their passports. After doing so they were placed in police vans, taken to a train station, and forced onto the cars. On Saturday October 29, the Grynszpan family arrived in Zbąszyń, confused and scared.

On October 31, Sendel Grynszpan's daughter Berta was able to send a post card from Zbąszyń to her brother Herschel Grynszpan in Paris. The post card, which detailed the cruelty and tragedy of the family's forced relocation reached Grynszpan. Horrified and distressed by the plight of his family and the thousands of other Polish Jews, Grynszpan took it upon himself to enact revenge. Purchasing a pistol, he went to the German Embassy in Paris on November 7. There he shot and ultimately killed First Secretary of the Reich, Ernst vom Rath.

The assassination of vom Rath stunned the Nazi regime. On November 9 and 10 Jewish businesses, properties, and synagogues were destroyed, burned, and looted across the Reich, with the assassination being used by the Nazis as a pretext. This event, often referred to as Kristallnacht is often seen by historians as a key moment of significance in the formulation of the Holocaust.

See also 
 1938 deportation of Jews from Slovakia

Further reading 

 Corb, Noam, From Tears Come Rivers, from Rivers Come Oceans, from Oceans -a Flood. Yad Vashem Studies, 2020.

References

External links 

Jews and Judaism in Poland
1938 in Germany
Second Polish Republic
World War II refugees
The Holocaust in Germany
Germany–Poland relations